The team dressage event, part of the equestrian program at the 2004 Summer Olympics, used the results of the first round of the individual dressage to award rankings.  That round was held on 20 August and 21 August 2004 at the Olympic Equestrian Centre on the outskirts of Markópoulo, in the Attica region of Greece.  Like all other equestrian events, the dressage competition was mixed gender, with both male and female athletes competing in the same division.  10 teams, each consisting of four horse and rider pairs, entered the contest.

Medalists

Results

By individual
The team event used the points from the first round of competition.  40 of the 52 pairs that competed in the individual event were members of a team.  Team members are shown below, with scores used for the team highlighted.

By team
Each team consisted of four pairs of horse and rider.  The scores of the top three pairs from each team were averaged to get the team score.

 Germany - 74.563
 Ulla Salzgeber riding Rusty, 78.208
 Martin Schaudt riding Weltall, 73.417
 Hubertus Schmidt riding Wansuela Suerte, 72.333
 Heike Kemmer riding Bonaparte, 71.292
 Spain - 72.917
 Beatriz Ferrer-Salat riding Beauvalais, 74.667
 Rafael Soto riding Invasor, 72.792
 Juan Antonio Jimenez riding Guizo, 71.292
 Ignacio Rambla riding Oleaje, 64.750
 United States - 71.500
 Deborah McDonald riding Brentina, 73.375
 Robert Dover riding Kennedy, 71.625
 Guenter Seidel riding Aragon, 69.500
 Lisa Wilcox riding Relevant 5, 68.792
 Netherlands - 71.264
 Anky van Grunsven riding Salinero, 74.208
 Sven Rothenberger riding Barclay II, 69.833
 Imke Bartels riding Lancet, 69.750
 Marlies van Baalen riding Idocus, 64.583
 Denmark - 69.333
 Per Sandgaard riding Zancor, 70.667
 Jon Pedersen riding Esprit de Valdemar, 69.000
 Andreas Helgstrand riding Cavan, 68.333
 Lone Joergensen riding Ludewig G, 65.750
 Sweden - 68.917
 Jan Brink riding Briar, 73.250
 Tinne Vilhelmson riding Just Mickey, 66.917
 Louise Nathorst riding Guinness, 66.583
 Minna Telde riding Sack, 65.375
 Great Britain - 68.903
 Carl Hester riding Escapado, 70.667
 Richard Davison riding Ballaseyr Royale, 68.542
 Emma Hindle riding Wie Weltmeyer, 67.500
 Nicola McGivern riding Active Walero, 66.458
 Austria - 66.570
 Victoria Max-Theurer riding Falcao, 68.667
 Nina Stadlinger riding Egalite, 67.375
 Friedrich Gaulhofer riding Wels, 63.667
 Peter Gmoser riding Don Debussy, 62.750
 Canada - 66.222
 Cynthia Ishoy riding Proton, 66.583
 Leslie Reid riding Mark, 66.083
 Belinda Trussell riding Royan II, 66.000
 Ashley Holzer riding Imperioso, 64.667
 Switzerland - 65.653
 Silvia Ikle riding Salieri CH, 67.042
 Christian Plaege riding Regent, 66.667
 Daniel Ramseier riding Palladio, 63.250
 Jasmine Sanche-Burger riding Mr G de Lully, WD

References

Team dressage